The Parmentier Wee Mite (sometimes Noel Wee Mite) was a British two-seat, parasol monoplane designed by Cecil Noel and first flown in Guernsey in 1933.

Design and development
The Wee Mite was a parasol monoplane with a welded steel frame with wooden wings and a fixed landing gear with a tailwheel. Designed by Cecil Noel and built by him and Harold James Le Parmentier it was initial powered by a  ABC Scorpion and first flown at Vazon Bay, Guernsey on 10 April 1933. It was successfully flown around Guernsey in a 50 minute flight on 15 September 1933.

It was registered as G-ACRL to Parmentier on 21 April 1934 It was dismantled and stored in 1936.

Specification (Salmson engine)

References

1930s British civil utility aircraft
Homebuilt aircraft
Parasol-wing aircraft
Single-engined tractor aircraft
Aircraft first flown in 1933
Aviation in Guernsey